Teams will compete in the sub-zonal tournaments, with all teams advancing, with each team carrying over the points it earns to the five zonal tournament, where teams not entered in the sub-zonal tournaments can enter. The top four teams in each group will advance to the second zonal round where teams are mixed.  The top 2 teams from the second zonal round will advance to the continental cup. The winner of the 2010–12 Continental Beach Volleyball Cup will advance to the Olympics 42 out of a 53 possible nations entered.

Men

Sub-zonal

Group A
Host: Dakar, Senegal
Dates: January 8–10, 2011

Host: Freetown, Sierra Leone
Dates: January 14–15, 2011

Group B
Host: Cotonou, Benin
Dates: January 30–31, 2010

Host: Lome, Togo
Dates: November 5–7, 2010

Group C
Host: Douala, Cameroon
Dates: January 27–29, 2011

Group D
Host: Gisenyi, Rwanda
Dates: December 2–4, 2010

Host: Khartoum, Sudan
Dates: December 24–25, 2010

Group E
Host: Windhoek, Namibia
Dates: January 21–23, 2011

Host: Maputo, Mozambique
Dates: February 4–6, 2011

Zonal round 1
Countries that didn't participate from the sub-zonal round are able to participate.  The top 4 countries advance to the next round.

The following countries withdrew after playing in the sub-zonal round.

The following countries entered without playing in the sub-zonal round.

Group A

Host: Freetown, Sierra Leone
Dates: July 3–5, 2011

Losers' bracket

Group B
Host: Ghana
Dates: August 16–18, 2011

Losers' bracket

Group C

Host: Libreville, Gabon
Dates: August 5–7, 2011

Group D

Host: Mombasa, Kenya
Dates: July 27–29, 2011

Losers' bracket

Group E

Host: Maputo, Mozambique
Dates: July 15–17, 2011

Zonal round 2
The top 2 of each pool qualifies to the African Continental Beach Volleyball Cup.

The following countries withdrew

Pool 1
Host: Congo
Dates: October 21–23, 2011

Pool 2

Host: Agadir, Morocco
Dates: October 11–12, 2011

Pool 3

Host: Tomé, Togo
Dates: October 14–16, 2011

  and  advanced to the finals.

Pool 4
Host: Abuja, Nigeria
Dates: October 28–30, 2011

  and  advanced to the finals.

Continental final

The following teams have qualified for the men's continental final.

Women

Sub-zonal

Group A

Host: Dakar, Senegal
Dates: January 8–10, 2011
{{Round2
|RD1=Final

|January 9||4||0
}}Host: Freetown, Sierra LeoneDates: January 14–15, 2011

Group BHost: Cotonou, BeninDates: October 30–31, 2010Host: Tomé, TogoDates: November 5–6, 2010

Group CHost: Douala, CameroonDates: January 27–29, 2011

Group DHost: Gisenyi, RwandaDates: December 2–4, 2010

Group EHost: Windhoek, NamibiaDates: January 21–23, 2011Host: Maputo, MozambiqueDates: February 4–6, 2011

Zonal round 1

Countries that didn't participate from the sub-zonal round are able to participate. The top 4 countries advance to the next round.

The following countries withdrew after playing in the sub-zonal round.
 
 

The following countries entered without playing in the sub-zonal round.
 
 
 
 
 
 

Group AHost: Freetown, Sierra LeoneDates: July 3–5, 2011

Losers' bracket

Group BHost: GhanaDates: August 16–18, 2011

Losers' bracket

Group CHost: Libreville, GabonDates: August 5–7, 2011

Group DHost: Mombasa, KenyaDates: July 27–29, 2011

Group EHost: Maputo, MozambiqueDates: July 15–17, 2011

Zonal round 2

The top 2 of each pool qualifies to the African Continental Beach Volleyball Cup.

The following countries withdrew
 
 
 
 
 

Pool 1Host: Tomé, TogoDates: October 14–16, 2011

  and  advanced to the finals.

Pool 2Host: Agadir, MoroccoDates: October 11–13, 2011

Pool 3Host: Bejaia, AlgeriaDates: October 27–29, 2011

  and  advanced to the finals.

Pool 4Host: Abuja, NigeriaDates:''' October 28–30, 2011

Continental final

The following teams have qualified for the women's continental final.

See also
 Volleyball at the 2012 Summer Olympics

References

O
O
O
Continental Beach Volleyball Cup